The Race Relations Act 1968 was an Act of the Parliament of the United Kingdom making it illegal to refuse housing, employment, or public services to a person on the grounds of colour, race, ethnic or national origins in Great Britain (although not in Northern Ireland, which had its own parliament at the time). It also created the Community Relations Commission to promote 'harmonious community relations'.

The Act made amendments to the Race Relations Act 1965. It was superseded (and repealed) by the Race Relations Act 1976.

On 25 October 1968, the Race Relations Bill was given Royal Assent and so came into law as the Race Relations Act 1968. This Act expanded the provisions of the 1965 Race Relations Act, which had banned racial discrimination in public places and made promoting racial hatred a crime. The 1968 Act focused on eradicating discrimination in housing and employment. It aimed to ensure that the second-generation immigrants “who have been born here” and were “going through our schools” would get “the jobs for which they are qualified and the houses they can afford”. Although there was considerable debate during the second reading of the Bill, consensus was eventually reached with the Bill passing its third reading 182 ayes to 44 noes.

The Act was criticised for poorly translating "new standards of behaviour" into an effective legal document. The bill which introduced the Act was the focus of Enoch Powell's Rivers of Blood speech, delivered to the West Midlands Conservative Association on 20 April 1968. Powell was sacked from Ted Heath's shadow cabinet the following day.

See also
 Ethnic relations
 Racism in the United Kingdom

References

External links
Text of the Act as originally enacted (PDF) from the Office of Public Sector Information.
50th Anniversary of the 1968 Race Relations Act - UK Parliament - Living Heritage

United Kingdom Acts of Parliament 1968
Anti-discrimination law in the United Kingdom
Race relations in the United Kingdom